Michal Lipson (born 1970) is an American physicist known for her work on silicon photonics. Lipson was named a 2010 MacArthur Fellow for contributions to silicon photonics especially towards enabling GHz silicon active devices . Until 2014, she was the Given Foundation Professor of Engineering at Cornell University in the school of electrical and computer engineering and a member of the Kavli Institute for Nanoscience at Cornell. She is now the Eugene Higgins Professor of Electrical Engineering at Columbia University. In 2009 she co-founded the company PicoLuz, which develops and commercializes silicon nanophotonics technologies. In 2019, she co-founded Voyant Photonics, which develops next generation lidar technology based on silicon photonics. In 2020 Lipson was elected the 2021 Vice President of The Optical Society and will serve as OSA President in 2023.

Education
After spending two years as a BS student at the Instituto de Física of the University of São Paulo, Lipson obtained a BS in physics from The Technion – Israel Institute of Technology in 1992. She went on to obtain a PhD in physics from the same university in 1998, with the thesis topic "Coupled Exciton-Photon Modes in Semiconductor Optical Microcavities." Lipson spent 2 years as a postdoctoral associate with Lionel Kimerling at MIT, and then accepted a position at Cornell University in 2001.

Career and research
Lipson is best known for her work on silicon photonics. She developed (along with other researchers around the world at IBM, Intel, Ghent University) silicon photonic components such as waveguide couplers, ring resonators, modulators, detectors, WDM wavelength sources and sensors on silicon platform. She published the first paper on a class of versatile waveguides known as Slot-waveguides in 2004, which has since been cited over one thousand times. In all her work has been cited 32373 times (as of January 18, 2018).   She was also the first to demonstrate optical parametric gain in silicon, which was considered an important step towards building optical amplifiers in silicon.

Lipson's McArthur fellowship  citation mentions her work in ring modulators (circular waveguides) as the key contribution of Lipson via the continued refinement of both opto-electronic and purely optical circuits for smaller size, increased efficiency, and accelerated switching speed  The resulting silicon-based photonic integrated circuits have the potential to improve signal transmission and processing dramatically.

Lipson has received numerous honors, including being the recipient of a Fulbright Fellowship and an NSF Young Investigator Career award. She is also an elected fellow of Optical Society of America (OSA). Her current research interests include optical metamaterials, low-power and compact optical modulators, and slot waveguides. Her work has appeared in Nature, Nature Photonics, and other journals.

Awards and honors
2005: National Science Foundation Career Award
2010: Blavatnik Award 
 2010: MacArthur Fellow
2013: Fellow of the Institute of Electrical and Electronics Engineers "For contributions to design and applications of nanoscale photonic devices" 
2015: Thomson Reuters top 1 percent highly cited researcher in the field of Physics
2017: R. W. Wood Prize - Optical Society of America
2018: Awarded an honorary doctorate by Trinity College Dublin
2019: IEEE Photonics Award
 2019: NAS Comstock Prize in Physics
2019: Elected Member of the NAS- National Academy of Sciences
2021: OSA John Tyndall Award in recognition of her fundamental and technological advances in integrated photonic devices

Selected works
Slot waveguides:

Frequency combs
J. S. Levy, A. Gondarenko, M. A. Foster, A. C. Turner-Foster, A. L. Gaeta, M. Lipson, "CMOS-compatible multiple-wavelength oscillator for on-chip optical interconnects." Nature Photonics 4, 37–40 (2010).
B. Stern, X. Ji, Y. Okawachi, A. L. Gaeta, M. Lipson, "Battery-operated integrated frequency comb generator". Nature. 562, 401 (2018).
A. Dutt, C. Joshi, X. Ji, J. Cardenas, Y. Okawachi, K. Luke, A. L. Gaeta, M. Lipson, "On-chip dual-comb source for spectroscopy". Science Advances 4, e1701858 (2018).
Ultralow-loss silicon and silicon nitride
J. Cardenas, C. B. Poitras, J. T. Robinson, K. Preston, L. Chen, M. Lipson, "Low loss etchless silicon photonic waveguides". Optics Express. 17, 4752–4757 (2009).
K. Luke, A. Dutt, C. B. Poitras, M. Lipson, "Overcoming Si3N4 film stress limitations for high quality factor ring resonators". Optics Express. 21, 22829–22833 (2013).
A. Griffith, J. Cardenas, C. B. Poitras, M. Lipson, "High quality factor and high confinement silicon resonators using etchless process". Optics Express, 20, 21341–21345 (2012).
X. Ji, F. A. S. Barbosa, S. P. Roberts, A. Dutt, J. Cardenas, Y. Okawachi, A. Bryant, A. L. Gaeta, M. Lipson, "Ultra-low-loss on-chip resonators with sub-milliwatt parametric oscillation threshold". Optica, 4, 619–624 (2017).
Nonlinear optics in silicon

Modulation in silicon

References

External links
 Lipson's group website at Columbia University.
 Lipson's personal page.
 Press coverage of Ultrafast Oscilloscope.

1970 births
Living people
21st-century American physicists
Technion – Israel Institute of Technology alumni
Cornell University College of Engineering faculty
Columbia School of Engineering and Applied Science faculty
MacArthur Fellows
Fellows of Optica (society)
Women in optics